A 60-bit word is typically used for high-precision floating-point calculations; it can also store 10 6-bit characters.

Examples
The only widely-used computers with 60-bit words were produced by Control Data Corporation (CDC), including the CDC 6000 series, the CDC 7600, and the CDC Cyber 70 and 170 series. Though the addressable unit was the 60-bit word, instructions were either 15 or 30 bits.

Early design documents for the IBM 7030 Stretch tentatively specified its word length as 60 bits; the final design used 64.

Emulator
Museum examples of 60-bit CDC machines exist. There also exists an emulator for the series which will simulate the CDC 60-bit machines on commodity hardware and operating systems.

References

Data unit
Control Data Corporation hardware